Chețani is a commune in Mureș County, Transylvania, Romania. Its population was 2,857 in 2002. It is composed of seven villages: Chețani, Coasta Grindului (Berekszéle), Cordoș (Kardos), Giurgiș (Györgyed), Grindeni (Gerendkeresztúr), Hădăreni (Hadrév) and Linț (Lincitanyák).

Natives
Aurel Pantea

See also
List of Hungarian exonyms (Mureș County)
1993 Hădăreni riots

References

External links
Town Hall

Communes in Mureș County
Localities in Transylvania